Five Are Together Again (published 1963) is a children's novel in The Famous Five series by Enid Blyton. It was first published by Hodder and Stoughton and in its first edition illustrated by Eileen Soper.

This is the 21st and last complete novel to feature the Famous Five and was published 21 years after their first adventure Five on a Treasure Island.

Plot introduction

The children are supposed to be staying at Kirrin Cottage, but as soon as George's parents' maid Joanna catches scarlet fever, the Five are sent to live with an old friend, called Tinker, and his famous scientist father, who first appeared in Five Go to Demon's Rocks (1961).  When top secret papers belonging to the scientist go missing, it is left up to the children to find the thief. There are some circus folk camping in Tinker's field. Five then head to the castle in the moor near Tinker's field.

External links
Enid Blyton Society page
 https://www.fadedpage.com/showbook.php?pid=20201055

daszre

1963 British novels
Famous Five novels
1963 children's books
Hodder & Stoughton books